KVOS v. Associated Press, 299 U.S. 269 (1936), was a United States Supreme Court case in which the Court held an association of newspapers cannot sue collectively to raise their projected damages above the minimum damages required for federal jurisdiction when only individual newspapers are parties to unfair competition.

References

External links
 

1936 in United States case law
United States copyright case law
United States Supreme Court cases
United States Supreme Court cases of the Hughes Court